Wadi Bani Khawlan is a sub-district located in the Jabal Habashi District, Taiz Governorate, Yemen. Wadi Bani Khawlan had a population of 3,264 according to the 2004 census.

References 

Sub-districts in Jabal Habashi District